Frank Lamar Christian, M.D. (February 23, 1876 – October 20, 1955), was the warden of Elmira Correctional Facility from 1917 to 1939.

Biography
He was born on February 23, 1876, in Waterloo, New York. He had a short career in baseball for one of the Rochester teams.

He attended Waterloo Academy, then Cornell University. He received his M.D. from Columbia University College of Physicians and Surgeons in 1899. He became the ambulance physician at Bellevue Hospital. He took a job at Eastern District Reformatory and in 1901 he was appointed as the medical superintendent of the Elmira Correctional Facility.

He was appointed as the warden of Elmira in 1917.

In 1929 he was appointed as the acting warden at Auburn Correctional Facility following a riot.

He retired after being stabbed in his car by two prisoners attempting an escape in 1939.

He died on October 20, 1955, at the Arnot-Ogden Hospital in Elmira, New York. He was buried in Woodlawn Cemetery.

Footnotes

1876 births
1955 deaths
American emergency physicians
Elmira Correctional Facility
Columbia University Vagelos College of Physicians and Surgeons alumni
Cornell University alumni
Burials at Woodlawn Cemetery (Elmira, New York)
American hospital administrators